Tousmouline is a municipality of El Bayadh Province in Algeria.

References

Communes of El Bayadh Province